Miss International 1972, the 12th Miss International pageant, was held on October 6, 1972 at Nippon Budokan in Tokyo, Japan. Delegates from 47 countries competed. Linda Hooks representing Britain won the country's second title by outgoing titleholder, Jane Cheryl Hansen from New Zealand.

Results

Placements

Contestants

  - Adriana Graciela Martin
  - Christine Nola Clark
  - Brigitt Matzak Von Goricke
  - Caroline A Devienne
  - Leticia Brunn Aguilera
  - Jane Vieira Macambira
  - Linda Hooks
  - Bonny Brady
  - Pamela Virginia Santibáñez Berg
  - Lamia El Kouri Chaia
  - Isabel Amador Zamora
  - Gitte Mogensen
  - Lucia del Carmen Fernández Avellaneda
  - Tarja Annikki Leskinen
  - Suzanne Angly
  - Brigitte Burfino
  - Neti Fasouli
  - Edna Maria Quintanilla
  - Allison John
  - Monica Strotmann
  - Kolbrun Sveinsdóttir
  - Indira Muthanna
  - Katherine Talbot
  - Rita Pistolozzi
  - Yuko Tamehisa
  - Suh Ae-ja
  - Lydia Thilgen
  - Francesca Lee Mei Fung
  - Dolores Abdilla
  - Margarita Julia Martinez
  - Janice Dawn Walker
  - Connie Anne Ballantyne Sequeira
  - Vigdis Thire
  - Yolanda "Yogi" Adriatico Dominguez
  - Gilda Isabel Abreu
  - Miriam López
  - May Tan
  - Gloria Puyol Toledo
  - Damayanthi Gunewardena
  - Eva Andersson
  - Anneliese Weber
  - Moea Arapari
  - Sarinya Thattavorn
  - Hulya Ercan
  - Christina Moller
  - Lindsay Bloom
  - Marilyn Plessman Martínez

Notes

Did not compete
  - Ronit Gafni

References

External links
Pageantopolis - 1972 Miss International

1972
1972 in Tokyo
1972 beauty pageants
Beauty pageants in Japan